The Revolutionary Syndicalist Committees (CSR) were a trade-unionist organization created in 1919 by Pierre Monatte inside the General Confederation of Labour (Confédération Générale du Travail, CGT) trade-union. It grouped the revolutionary syndicalists who were opposed to the Union sacrée national bloc during World War I and to the CGT's collaboration with the government.

Pierre Monatte became the CSR general secretary in 1921. They boasted 300,000 members. Meanwhile, the revolutionary syndicalists quickly became again in majority inside the CGT, and in 1921, following the equivalent of the 1920 Tours Congress for the French Section of the Workers' International (SFIO, socialist party), a split divided Léon Jouhaux's reformist trade-unionists with other revolutionary members, who founded the Confédération générale du travail unitaire (CGTU).

After Monatte's exclusion from the French Communist Party (PCF) in 1924, he created along with other ex-members the Ligue syndicaliste (Syndicalist League) to organize again the revolutionary syndicalists. They published the Révolution Prolétarienne (Proletarian Revolution) journal which succeeded to Monatte's Vie Ouvrière.

In 1936, the CGT and the CGTU re-unified themselves, an event in which the Syndicalist League's initiative of launching the Comité des 22 (Committee of the 22) grouping together since 1924 known activists of the CGT, the CGTU and autonomous trade-unions. The following year, however, some revolutionary syndicalists opposed both to the parties' influence on the trade unions and to inner bureaucracy split to form the Cercles Syndicalistes Lutte de Classe (Syndicalist Circles Class Struggle).

Following the 1995 strikes, a trade-unionist current took again the name, claiming itself of its founders. They included members of the CGT, Solidaires Unitaires Démocratiques (SUD) and the CNT-Vignoles, and publish a journal called Syndicaliste!.

External links 
Syndicaliste review 

Trade unions in France
National trade union centers of France
Syndicalist trade unions
Trade unions established in 1919